Barksdale is an unincorporated community in the town of Barksdale, Bayfield County, Wisconsin, United States.

History
Barksdale was named in 1904 for H. M. Barksdale, the president of a local powder mill. A post office was established at Barksdale in 1904, and remained in operation until it was discontinued in 1966.

References

Unincorporated communities in Bayfield County, Wisconsin
Unincorporated communities in Wisconsin